The 2018 season was IFK Göteborg's 113th in existence, their 86th season in Allsvenskan and their 42nd consecutive season in the league. They competed in Allsvenskan and Svenska Cupen.

Players

Squad

Club

Other information

Competitions

Overall

Allsvenskan

League table

Results summary

Results by round

Matches
Kickoff times are in UTC+2 unless stated otherwise.

Svenska Cupen

2017–18
The tournament continued from the 2017 season.

Kickoff times are in UTC+1.

Group stage

Knockout stage

2018–19
The tournament continued into the 2019 season.

Qualification stage

Non competitive

Pre-season
Kickoff times are in UTC+1.

Mid-season
Kickoff times are in UTC+2.

References

IFK Göteborg seasons
IFK Goteborg